Connie Francis Sings Modern Italian Hits is a studio album recorded by American entertainer Connie Francis.

Background
The album featured cover versions of contemporary Italian hits previously recorded by other artists between 1958 and 1962, several of them being entries to the renowned Sanremo Festival. Winning songs of the festival were also Italy's contributions to the Eurovision Song Contest during the respective years.

Most of the album's featured songs were recorded by Francis bilingually in English/Italian. Only "Addio, addio", "Nun è peccato", "Tango italiano", and "Ventiquattromila baci" were recorded entirely in Italian.

The album's twelve tracks were chosen from a total of twenty-four finished recordings cut between November 9, 1961 and November 3, 1962. Arrangements were provided by Cliff Parman, Giulio Libano and LeRoy Holmes.

All three versions of the opening track, "Al di là" (for further details see below), were released either as a single or Extended Play (EP). Although the bilingual Italian/English version only peaked at # 90 in the United States, "Al di là" became Francis's most successful Italian single recording internationally, peaking at No. 1 in several countries.

Track listing

Side A

Side B

Not included songs from the sessions

NOTE: During the 1960s, entries to the Sanremo Festival were usually presented by two different artists using individual orchestral arrangements to emphasize the status of the festival as a composers' and not a vocalists' competition. Therefore, the Sanremo entries in these listings name two Italian artists for the recording of the original version.

References

Connie Francis albums
1963 albums
Albums produced by Danny Davis (country musician)
MGM Records albums
Italian-language albums